Ivan Nikolov Tatarchev (29 August 1930 – 24 December 2008) was a Bulgarian jurist who served as the chief prosecutor of Bulgaria between 1992 and 1999.

Biography 

In 1952, Tatarchev finished his legal studies at Sofia University. Between 1958 and 1961, he was barred from practicing law for political reasons.

Tatarchev was known for his patriotic views. His grandfather, Mihail Tatarchev, was the brother of Hristo Tatarchev, one of the founders of IMRO.

References 

20th-century Bulgarian lawyers
Bulgarian nationalists
1930 births
People from Sofia
2008 deaths
General Prosecutors of Bulgaria